was an ace fighter pilot in the Imperial Japanese Navy during World War II.  Participating in many of the Pacific War battles and campaigns as a member of several units, Yamamoto was officially credited with destroying 11 enemy aircraft.  He was killed in aerial combat with American carrier fighters on June 19, 1944 during the Battle of the Philippine Sea.

References

1918 births
1944 deaths
Japanese naval aviators
Japanese World War II flying aces
Military personnel from Ehime Prefecture
Japanese military personnel killed in World War II
Imperial Japanese Navy officers